Nishy Lee Lindo (born 30 November 2002) is a Costa Rican taekwondo practitioner. She won one of the bronze medals in the women's 57kg event at the 2019 Pan American Games held in Lima, Peru.

In 2020, she competed at the Pan American Olympic Qualification Tournament held in Costa Rica. She finished in 3rd place and she did not qualify to compete at the 2020 Summer Olympics in Tokyo, Japan. However, she was able to compete as Fernanda Aguirre of Chile had to withdraw after testing positive for COVID-19. Lindo was eliminated in her first match in the women's 57kg event.

She competed in the women's featherweight event at the 2022 World Taekwondo Championships held in Guadalajara, Mexico.

References

External links 
 

Living people
2002 births
Place of birth missing (living people)
Costa Rican female taekwondo practitioners
Pan American Games medalists in taekwondo
Pan American Games bronze medalists for Costa Rica
Taekwondo practitioners at the 2019 Pan American Games
Medalists at the 2019 Pan American Games
Taekwondo practitioners at the 2020 Summer Olympics
Olympic taekwondo practitioners of Costa Rica
21st-century Costa Rican women